Charles Carmine Antonio Baldi (December 2, 1862 – December 28, 1930) was an American merchant, banker, newspaper publisher, entrepreneur and philanthropist who lived in Philadelphia, Pennsylvania. He immigrated from Italy at age 14 and pursued a career that gained him recognition in the early 1900s as a prominent leader among the growing population of Americans citizens originating from Italian descent (Italian Americans). Baldi further achieved strong relationships with the existing American political and business communities in the greater Philadelphia area that developed from his business enterprises, which included social and philanthropic organizations that centered around supporting the lifestyle of Italian immigrant people to attain improved economic status and preserve traditional cultural heritage while living in the United States of America.

Early life
Carmine Antonio Baldi was born 1862 in Castlenoovo, Cilento, the Providence of Salerno Italy.  As a boy in Italy, he first distinguished himself by helping to write letters for the peasant women of his town to their relatives in America. Young Carmine would learn by reading about America in the letters coming back in response and was reasoned why he became fascinated with the life in America. He immigrated from Italy to Philadelphia Pennsylvania at age 14 with his Father and 12-year old brother. Later he changed his name to "Charles Carmen Antonio Baldi" and adopted the “C.C.A. Baldi” naming convention.

Career
His first start-up business in America was a push cart fruit stand that rose to notoriety by skillfully cornering the local wholesaling and retailing market selling lemons. This successful enterprise provided revenue to invest in other ventures and he began to manage for profit job contracts with the railroads to employ Italian immigrants who needed to be employed in a job for them to come to America and also facilitated their acquiring basic needs for housing and other services.

He organized a bank, the First Italian Exchange Bank, so immigrant workers could save their money and send money back to relatives in Italy. He owned and operated the largest daily Italian language newspaper L'Opinione from 1906-1930  that provided job openings, news of the day in both America and Italy. It later incorporated into the Italian language daily newspaper under Il Progresso Italo-Americano that began in 1906 as L'Opinione, and was published until 1989. Baldi founded an anthracite coal yard supply Company C.C.A. Baldi & Brothers Co Inc. based on experience the brothers had with mining operations and the need to supply an environmentally clean home heating fuel to replace wood. Additionally, Baldi operated a real estate and insurance business catering to Italian immigrant workers and founded a charity organization The Italian Federation of Charitable Societies while providing a  leadership role in a worker society Mutuo Soccorso di SanBiagio. His early letter writing provided him language skills and he provided interpreter services for Italian-speaking people for the Courts of Philadelphia. He established and operated a funeral home Baldi Funeral Home dedicated to servicing Italian Americans families that has carried his family name for over four generations in South Philadelphia. His interest in politics and education lead him to be appointed to School District of Philadelphia Board of education and served on that board until his death in 1930.

Awards and Honors	

 

On April 19, 1907, as a publisher he was awarded the decorations of Commander in the Order of the Crown of Italy and Chevalier of Knighthood in the Order of Saints Maurice and Lazarus (Italian: Ordine dei Santi Maurizio e Lazzaro) (abbreviated OSSML) a Roman Catholic dynastic order of knighthood, awarded him by King Victor Emmanuel III Kingdom of Italy (Italian: Regno d'Italia) for his work in behalf of Italians living in America. 

In 1976, the City of Philadelphia recognized CCA Baldi as the first immigrant named to the School District of Philadelphia Board of Education, on which he served until his death in 1930, by naming Baldi Middle School after him to commemorate his service in education.

In 2017 the C.C.A. Baldi residence located at 319 Green Lane, Philadelphia was designated as a Historic Place in Pennsylvania by the Pennsylvania Historical and Museum Commission.

Descendants
Baldi was the father of five sons and two daughters. At his death in 1930, his sons were Dr. Frederick. S. Baldi, medical director of the Philadelphia County prisons and former president of the Philadelphia County Medical Society; Vito M. Baldi, C.C.A. Baldi, Jr., member of the Legislature from the Second District; Joseph F.M. Baldi, member of the Legislature from the Fourteenth District, and Virgil Baldi, and daughters, Rose Baldi and Mrs. Louisa Douglas. Pop music artist Taylor Swift revealed that C.C.A. Baldi was her great-great-grandfather.

Further reading
King of Little Italy: C.C.A. Baldi & His Brothers By Charles G. Douglas, III; with Victor L. Baldi, III, and Douglas Baldi Swift|retrieved December 29. 2022

Marker application documents, Philadelphia Historical Commission, Home of Charles C. A. Baldi, 2017|Retrieved December 29, 2022.

References

1862 births
1930 deaths
Italian emigrants to the United States
People from Salerno 
American people of Italian descent
People from Philadelphia